Eunomia is one of the Horae, goddesses of Greek mythology. Eunomia may also refer to:

 Eunomia (moth), a moth genus
 The Eunomia family of asteroids (named after the goddess)
15 Eunomia, the largest asteroid in that family
 Eunomia (plant), a genus of plants in the family Brassicaceae
 A fictional computer in SoltyRei; see List of SoltyRei characters#Eunomia

See also 
 Callicore eunomia, a nymphalid butterfly species 
 Boloria eunomia (formerly Proclossiana eunomia eunomia), scientific names for the bog fritillary butterfly